Detonator (previously known as Detonator: Bombs Away from 2014–2021) is a tower ride at Thorpe Park in Chertsey, Surrey, England, UK. It was manufactured by Fabbri and is a 'Mega Drop Tower'. It opened in 2001 along with two other 'flat' rides, Vortex and Zodiac. The ride operator at the bottom has a button, which can be pressed to make the car release at any time once the car has reached the top. Once released, the car is fired downwards by pneumatics rather than simply falling under gravity, with the ride reaching a speed of 46 mph at the base of the drop, giving the impression of weightlessness for riders. For the 2011 season on ride photos were added. These were later removed in the 2013 season. The ride made a world record for most g force on a free fall ride with 5.5.

History
In July 2000, Thorpe Park's Wicked Witches Haunt and part of Mr Rabbit's Tropical Travels were destroyed in a fire. Although Mr Rabbit's Tropical Travels was recovered and reopened later in the year, Wicked Witches Haunt was destroyed beyond repair. This left a vast open space in the park - to fill that space, they applied for temporary planning permission for a Fabbri Mega-Drop.

In 2001 Detonator opened as the parks tallest ride at 115 feet in replacement of Wicked Witches Haunt. The ride's success meant the park applied for extended planning permission, making this ride a permanent addition. In 2007, the ride opened with a new theme tune after the park decided it was no longer plausible to pay royalties for the original soundtrack.

In 2014, with the opening of Angry Birds Land, Detonator was rethemed to "Detonator: Bombs Away". The theme tune used the same track as used in 2001 until 2016. From 2016 the theme tune was changed to a more upbeat tune mixed with sound effects from Angry Birds.

In 2022, both the online website as well as entrance signage to the ride had been updated, with the name once again as "Detonator".

Fright Nights
Detonator audio track at Fright Nights:  Whilst going up the vertical track, a music box is heard playing, which slows down until a bolt of lightning strikes. Once the rider is at the top, The Director (who runs "Thorpe Park Movie Studios") says "As always, every stunt here at Thorpe Park Movie Studios is safe, except this one". A scream is then heard as the gondola plummets back down to the ground. It used to have a child singing Humpty Dumpty.

References

External links
 Thorpe Park - Detonator
 Detonator at Total Thorpe Park
 Detonator at ThemeParks-UK

Amusement rides introduced in 2001
Towers completed in 2001
Buildings and structures in Surrey
Drop tower rides
Thorpe Park
Amusement rides manufactured by Fabbri Group